Richard Lynch (1611–1676) was an Irish theologian and Jesuit.

Born in Galway to one of the Tribes of Galway, he was educated by the Jesuits at Compostela and joined the society in 1630. In 1637 he was made rector of the Irish College in Seville. He died at Salamanca in 1676 having lived most of his life in Spain. The library at Salamanca holds many of his theological works in manuscript form, many of which were written in Spanish.

Bibliography
 Universa Philosophia Scholastica, i, ii, iii, Lyons, 1654
 Sermones varios, Salamanca, 1670
 De Deo ultimo fine, i, ii, Salamanca, 1671
 Sermon Panezyrico a la Canonizacion de Francisco de Borja, con circumstancias de la rudificacion de el Colegio de la Compania de Jesus, de Medina del Campo, despeus de su grema, y Jubileo de quarenta horas, Salamanca, 1674.

See also
 John Lynch (Gratianus Lucius)
 Stephen Lynch (Franciscan)
 Peirce Lynch

References

 The Tribes of Galway:1124-1642, Adrian Martyn, Galway, 2016.

1611 births
1676 deaths
17th-century Irish Jesuits
Irish emigrants to Spain
People from County Galway
17th-century Irish Roman Catholic theologians